Chirag Kahan Roshni Kahan is a 1959 Indian Hindi-language film directed and produced by Devendra Goel. The film stars Rajendra Kumar as the protagonist Dr Anand and Meena Kumari, Honey Irani and Madan Puri in pivotal roles. The film was remade in Telugu as Maa Babu.

Plot
Before giving birth to her child, Ratna (Meena Kumari) loses her husband, and eventually gives birth to a dead child. Dr. Anand's  (Rajendra Kumar)wife also gives birth to a baby and it dies on the same day. Ratnas' condition after delivery is critical, so to save her, Dr. Anand gives his baby boy to her.

Four years later, Dr. Anand, to meet Raju (Honey Irani), re-enters her life and soon becomes a frequent visitor, much to the displeasure of Ratna's mother-in-law (Mumtaz Begum) and her husband's sister Bela, both of whom start maltreating her and making her life miserable. Anand stops visiting thereafter. Anand soon marries a nurse called Maya Verma (Minu Mumtaz). Maya is a squanderer, and her relationship with Anand falters. Moreover, he later finds out that she cannot conceive. When Anand's dad passes away, he leaves considerable wealth to Anand's child, including a fair monthly allowance. Maya plots with an advocate, S. Prakash (Sunder), who happens to be Bela's husband, to fabricate a story that Anand's father was mentally unbalanced while writing the testament. This plan fails.

Now along with her aunt, Nurse Sarla Verma (Nilambai), Maya claims that Ratna's son is actually Anand's biological son, leading to their lawyer filing a custodial case in court. 

Court gives custody of Raju to Dr. Anand and Maya. Raju is quite unhappy and escapes from Dr. Anand's House at night. Maya, Ratna and Dr. Anand follow him. Maya dies in an accident while chasing Raju and Raju returns to Ratna.  Ratna's mother in law marries her to Dr. Anand and the story ends on happy note.

Cast
Rajendra Kumar as Dr. Anand
Meena Kumari as Ratna
Madan Puri as Dr. Ashok Mehta
Honey Irani as Raju
Minoo Mumtaz as Nurse Maya Verma
Sunder as Advocate S. Prakash
Asit Sen as Solicitor
Mumtaz Begum as Ratna's Mother-In-Law

Music

Awards
The film received two nominations at the 1960 annual Filmfare Awards:
Nominated, Filmfare Best Actress Award - Meena Kumari
Nominated, Filmfare Best Story Award - Dhruva Chatterjee

References

External links

Films scored by Ravi
1959 films
1950s Hindi-language films
Indian drama films
Hindi films remade in other languages
Films directed by Devendra Goel
Indian pregnancy films
1959 drama films
Hindi-language drama films